Morris Township is a township in Sullivan County, in the U.S. state of Missouri.

Morris Township was erected in 1845, taking its name from Roberson Morris, an early citizen.

References

Townships in Missouri
Townships in Sullivan County, Missouri